The Deep Six is a 1958 American World War II drama film directed by Rudolph Maté, loosely based on a novel of the same name by Martin Dibner. The film stars Alan Ladd, who co-produced it, William Bendix, Dianne Foster, Keenan Wynn, James Whitmore, and Efrem Zimbalist Jr. It also marked the film debut of Joey Bishop. It was distributed by Warner Bros.

The storyline depicts the conflicts of a U.S. naval officer in combat during World War II with his destroyer shipmates and his conscience over the values instilled in him by his Quaker upbringing.

Plot
In September 1942, during World War II, Susan Cahill (Dianne Foster), art director for an ad agency on Madison Avenue run by her fiance, is jealous of his business flirtation with a client's daughter to secure a deal. She accepts an invitation to dinner on Long Island from agency artist Alexander "Alec" Austen (Alan Ladd). Susan is disturbed by Alec's obvious feelings for her, but accepts a lunch date the next day anyway. After she leaves, Alec receives a telegram to report for active duty in the U.S. Navy but decides not to tell Susan as their relationship grows. Just before reporting for duty, Alec takes Susan home to meet his mother, a Quaker, revealing to them his hope to marry Susan—and his call up. His mother is hurt that Alec did not disclose his military obligation and saddened that he has disregarded the pacifist tenets of his upbringing. Susan admits she loves Alec, but will not break her engagement.

Alec reports aboard his ship, the destroyer USS Poe, at the Brooklyn Navy Yard, with no one to see him off as it departs for San Francisco. The ship's captain, Cmdr. Meredith (James Whitmore), quickly takes a shine to Alec and he is befriended by his roommate and the ship's doctor, Lt. Blanchard (Efrem Zimbalist Jr.), who soon realizes Alec is "carrying a torch" for Susan. However, the ship's executive officer, Lt. Comdr. Edge (Keenan Wynn), has an immediate dislike of Alec's Quaker background and objects to his assignment as assistant gunnery officer. Alec introduces himself to the sailors in the gunnery division, catching them gambling but overlooking the offense. Chief Petty Officer "Frenchy" Shapiro (William Bendix) congratulates Alec for the way he handled the situation but receives a gentle warning that they best not repeat it. The two become close friends despite their differences in rank when Frenchy reveals that he became estranged from his wife because of his Navy duty. Underway, the ship picks up three survivors from a sunken German submarine, but when Blanchard and Alec attempt to treat them humanely, Edge angrily intervenes. He accuses Alec of being less than a man because he cannot hate, but Alec assures him that he can.

In San Francisco, Alec begins drawing a portrait of his Frenchy to give to his daughter. The captain gives Alec a five-day liberty to meet Susan, who has come to California after Blanchard contacted her. They agree to marry immediately and travel to Pebble Beach to stay with Susan's sister, who unfortunately receives notification that her husband has been killed in action. Alec decides to return to the ship and marry Susan only upon his safe return from duty. At sea in the Aleutian Islands, when an aircraft is spotted approaching the ship, the gunners plead for orders to open fire but Alec cannot bring himself to give the command. The plane turns out to be American, apparently justifying the hesitation, but he admits to the captain that he simply froze. Although sympathetic, the captain swaps Alec's assignment with that of the damage control officer. Edge violently condemns Alec and the entire crew save Frenchy shun Alec for being a conscientious objector. During an actual Japanese air attack, a bomb crashes through the deck without exploding. With Frenchy's help, Alec throws the unexploded bomb overboard. At a funeral service for sailors killed in the air attack, the captain reminds the crew that they all might have died without Alec and Frenchy's bravery.

The ship docks at Dutch Harbor, where the navy seamen quarrel with those from the Merchant Marine. Alec tries to intervene and is knocked to the ground by a merchant mariner. Mocked for apparently "turning the other cheek," Alec defends himself but is accidentally knocked unconscious by Frenchy when a brawl begins. He admits to Blanchard that he felt an angry urge to kill, but Blanchard reassures him that his response was natural. Alec volunteers to lead a dangerous mission ashore to rescue stranded airmen and their reconnaissance photos of the Japanese-held island, joined by Frenchy and several members of the crew. They link up with the airmen, but cut off along the beach by Japanese soldiers, Alec orders his men to open fire and calls the ship for fire support. Frenchy is forced to kill a Japanese soldier shooting at them when Alec cannot bring himself to fire his own weapon. As Frenchy openly pities his friend, four enemy soldiers emerge and Frenchy is wounded. Alec kills them to protect his friend and is also wounded, but Frenchy dies before they make it back to the ship. Soon after, Alec returns to Susan with Frenchy's completed portrait to deliver to his daughter.

Cast
 Alan Ladd as Alexander 'Alec' Austen  
 Dianne Foster as Susan Cahill  
 William Bendix as 'Frenchy' Shapiro  
 Keenan Wynn as Lt. Comdr. Mike Edge  
 James Whitmore as Comdr. Warren Meredith  
 Efrem Zimbalist Jr. as Lieut. Blanchard  
 Joey Bishop as Ski Krokowski
 Peter Hansen as Lieutenant Dooley
 Jerry Mathers as Steve Innes (uncredited)

Production

Development
The novel was published in 1953 and became a bestseller.

Rights to the novel were bought by Ladd's Jaguar Productions in 1955. The film was always envisioned as a starring vehicle for Ladd; possible co-stars included Fredric March and Edward G. Robinson. Eventually, William Bendix was cast in the role.

At one point, Doris Day was announced as the film's female lead as part of a three- picture deal to be made over three years; she and Ladd would co-star in two films. This did not happen, however, and Dianne Foster was cast instead.

The Deep Six was to be the first of a ten-picture deal between Jaguar and Warner Bros. to be made over three years. Ladd wanted to use Jaguar to develop new talent and hoped to showcase them in the film.

Screenplay
The screenplay incorporated several subplots (primarily the portraits created by Austen) and characters/back stories from Dibner's 1953 novel, but the plot of the film largely focused on Alec Austen's spiritual crisis of pacifism versus duty, which in the novel did not occur. Likewise the screenplay, except for the issue of abuse of authority by some officers, did not address the major themes of the novel: the clinging by the regular navy chain of command early in the war to archaic customs and traditions that proved detrimental to morale and endangered ships in combat; racial discrimination; sadistic criminal acts, including homosexual rape, by officers and sailors who served in the pre-war Navy; and the assignment in a hurriedly expanded wartime navy of incompetent or marginally qualified regular officers to positions of trust and authority. In the novel the executive officer, an Annapolis-trained senior officer, has a mental breakdown even though higher authority knew from his abusive behavior that he should not be serving on a ship in combat, and commits suicide during battle. The climactic battle scene of the novel, a large scale surface action closely resembling the Battle of the Komandorski Islands, in the film became a minor land skirmish involving Austen's shore party during a rescue attempt.

Characters' traits and motivations were altered to match the personalities of the actors cast in the roles, or as in the case of Kennan Wynn's character, were a composite of two major characters.

Shooting
Filming started 15 April 1957.

Jerry Mathers is seen in an uncredited role as one of the children of Susan's sister.  At the time, Mathers starred in the television series Leave It to Beaver

The film transformed the novel's light cruiser Atlantis (the fictional counterpart of the USS Richmond), a ship with a skipper who loathes the sea and a crew of dispirited castoffs, into the destroyer Poe.

Its configuration was altered to resemble its wartime appearance, including removal of modern radar and the installation on the fantail of 20mm gun gun mounts. Maté used most of the ship's complement as shipboard extras, rotating a few at a time on a daily basis and praising their cooperation and abilities. As a result, the credits mention "The Officers and Men of the U.S.S. Stephen Potter".

Reception

Critical response
Howard H. Thompson of The New York Times wrote in his review: "Unfortunately, having stated its case—the hero's mental conflict—this Warners release then sidesteps the issue almost to the finale. The loose, rambling result brims with clichés, at the expense of dramatic unity and, finally, conviction. And going by some bright dialogue in the John Twist–Martin Rackin–Harry Brown script, and Rudolph Mate's erratic direction, there is ample evidence that the parties responsible knew better."

Release and home media
The Deep Six was released in theaters on January 15, 1958. The film was later released on February 13, 2013 by Warner Home Video as part of their Warner Archive Collection.

References

External links 
 
 
 
 
 USS Stephen Potter

1958 films
1958 drama films
American war drama films
American World War II films
1950s war drama films
Films about Quakers
Films based on American novels
Films directed by Rudolph Maté
Pacific War films
Films scored by David Buttolph
Films with screenplays by Harry Brown (writer)
Films about the United States Navy in World War II
Warner Bros. films
1950s English-language films
1950s American films